The Mauboussin M.112, M-12 or Mauboussin M.XII was originally called the Peyret-Mauboussin PM XII and was renamed when Mauboussin founded his own company in 1931, ending his partnership with Louis Peyret. It was a French, single-engine, two-seat, low cantilever wing touring monoplane. At least six were built.

Design and development

The low, cantilever wing of the M.112 was built in three parts, a tapered centre-section which was part of the fuselage and trapezoidal outer panels with elliptical tips. Its aspect ratio of 9.5 was high for the time. The outer panels carried mild dihedral and full-span, narrow-chord ailerons. The wings were completely wooden, with twin box spars and alder plywood skin.

It was powered by an uncowled  Salmson 9Ad nine-cylinder radial engine with its fuel tanks in the wing centre-section. Behind it, beyond a firewall, the wooden fuselage had a rectangular section defined by four longerons, though the upper decking was curved. It was covered in plywood. The M.112 had a pair of tandem seats over the wing, with the pilot at the rear. These seats could be open or enclosed by a removable cover. The fuselage tapered to the rear where the tail surfaces, also ply-covered, were straight-tapered and round tipped. Both horizontal and vertical surfaces had quite high aspect ratios and the vertical tail was tall; the horizontal tail was mounted on top of the fuselage. Both rudder and elevators were aerodynamically unbalanced.

The M.112 had conventional, fixed landing gear. Its mainwheels, fitted with brakes, were on cranked axles and drag struts, both hinged from the lower fuselage longerons. Its tailskid, which could be replaced with a wheel, castered and had twin small bungee shock absorbers.

Operational history

Built at the Zenith factory, the M.XII first flew in September 1931. In August 1932, flown by André Nicolle and registered as a Mauboussin M.112, it competed in the Challenge International de Tourisme 1932, which involved both technical tests and a  circuit around Europe. It came last, but with its very low-powered engine, was the only aircraft in its class. It also appeared at the 1932 Paris Aero Salon. The French civil aircraft register included six M.112s, used by aero clubs and individuals.

Aircraft in the Mauboussin M.120 Corsaire series which followed were similar to the M.112 but heavier and with more powerful engines.

Specifications

References

Peyret aircraft
Mauboussin aircraft
1930s French sport aircraft
Single-engined tractor aircraft
Low-wing aircraft
Aircraft first flown in 1931